Olavi Reimas (born Unto Kalervo Eskola; 14 March 1914 − 9 June 1995) was a Finnish actor. He appeared in 19 films between 1938−1958. Most of them were directed by Valentin Vaala.

Filmography 

Sysmäläinen (1938)
Vihreä kulta (1939)
Rikas tyttö (1939)
Jumalan myrsky (1940)
Morsian yllättää (1941)
Antreas ja syntinen Jolanda (1941)
Varaventtiili (1942)
Neljä naista (1942)
Tositarkoituksella (1943)
Syntynyt terve tyttö (1943)
Keinumorsian (1943)
Suomisen Olli rakastuu (1944)
Miesmalli (1944)
Vain sinulle (1945)
En ole kreivitär (1945)
Synnin jäljet (1946)
Maaret − tunturien tyttö (1947)
Sinut minä tahdon (1949)
Hyvää päivää Saarisen perhe (1958)

References

External links 
 

1914 births
1995 deaths
Finnish male film actors
20th-century Finnish male actors